Champagné may refer to:

People
 Lt.-Gen. Forbes Champagné (1754–1816), a British Army officer
 Rev. George Champagné (–1828), an Irish clergyman
 Gen. Sir Josiah Champagné (1755–1840), a British Army officer

Places
 Champagné, Sarthe, a commune in the Sarthe département
 Champagné-le-Sec, a commune in the Vienne département
 Champagné-les-Marais, a commune in the Vendée département
 Champagné-Saint-Hilaire, a commune in the Vienne département

See also 
 Champagne (disambiguation)